Aurora Jiménez de Palacios (December 9, 1922 – April 15, 1958) was a Mexican lawyer and politician who became the first female federal deputy in Mexico.

In 1937 she participated in the formation of the Confederation of Mexican Workers, in Culiacán, Sinaloa.

She was a graduate of the University of Guadalajara in 1947.

Later she represented Baja California as a federal deputy in the 42nd Legislature. She was the first female federal deputy in Mexico.

She was killed in a plane crash on April 15, 1958.

References

1922 births
1958 deaths
Institutional Revolutionary Party politicians
Members of the Chamber of Deputies (Mexico)
Mexican women lawyers
Politicians from Nayarit
University of Guadalajara alumni
Victims of aviation accidents or incidents in Mexico
Victims of aviation accidents or incidents in 1958
20th-century Mexican lawyers
20th-century Mexican politicians
20th-century Mexican women politicians
Women members of the Chamber of Deputies (Mexico)
People from Tecuala